The Young Hegelians and Karl Marx is a 1969 book by the political scientist David McLellan.

Summary

McLellan examines the transformations of Georg Wilhelm Friedrich Hegel's thought by the Young Hegelians, and the influence of their social and political views on Karl Marx.

References

1969 non-fiction books
Books about Georg Wilhelm Friedrich Hegel
Books about Marxism
Books by David McLellan
English-language books
English non-fiction books
Political philosophy literature
Social philosophy literature